4-H alumni have participated in many fields. One out of every seven adults in the U.S. is a former 4-H member. Participation in 4-H events and activities, the value of projects completed and the challenges and responsibilities experienced in 4-H have contributed to the personal and leadership development of 4-H alumni. A majority of alumni feel that 4-H experiences have also significantly contributed to their success in the workforce and that the knowledge and skills gained through 4-H continue to benefit them in their adult lives.

Many notable politicians, entertainers, athletes, business individuals and educators got their first start in 4-H.

Political figures

Notable alumni include U.S. President Jimmy Carter, and U.S. Vice Presidents Al Gore and Walter Mondale.

Current and former U.S. Senators
Howard Baker
Birch Bayh
Sam Brownback
Dale Bumpers
Conrad Burns
Ben Nighthorse Campbell
Thad Cochran
Mike DeWine 
Bob Dole
Byron Dorgan
Wendell H. Ford
Bob Graham
Judd Gregg 
Clifford Hansen
Tom Harkin 
Orrin Hatch 
Mike Johanns
Jon Llewellyn Kyl
Mitch McConnell
Bill Nelson
Sam Nunn
Larry Pressler
Pat Roberts
W. Kerr Scott
Jeff Sessions
Paul Simon
Debbie Stabenow
Steve Symms
Herman Talmadge
Craig L. Thomas
Strom Thurmond
Malcolm Wallop

Current and former U.S. Governors
Alabama
George Wallace
Arkansas
Asa Hutchinson
Georgia
Roy Barnes
Nathan Deal
Sonny Perdue
Hawai'i
John Waihee
Iowa
Terry Brandstad
Kansas
William H. Avery
John W. Carlin 
Nancy Kassebaum
Kentucky
Martha Layne Collins
Paul E. Patton
Maine
John Baldacci
Michigan
John Engler
North Carolina
Jim Hunt
Robert W. Scott
Oklahoma Mary Fallin
Raymond D. Gary
North Dakota
William L. Guy
Tennessee
Buford Ellington
Utah
Olene Walker
Vermont
Jim Douglas
Virginia
Gerald L. Baliles
Wisconsin
Tommy Thompson
Wyoming
Mike Sullivan

Current and former Members of Congress include
Carl Albert
William Vollie Alexander Jr.
John F. Baldwin, Jr.
Roscoe Bartlett
Rick Berg
Jaime Herrera Beutler
Tom Bevill
Rick Boucher
Allen Boyd
William V. Chappell Jr.
Donald H. Clausen
Eva M. Clayton
Howard Coble
Tony Coelho
Larry Combest
Jim Cooper
George Darden
Robert William Davis
Roy Dyson
Bill Emerson
Glenn English
Ronnie Flippo
William D. Ford
Virginia Foxx
Sam Gejdenson
William F. Goodling
James W. Grant
Ralph Hall
John Paul Hammerschmidt
Katherine Harris
J.D. Hayworth
Wally Herger
Clyde Holloway
Jerry Huckaby
Kenny Hulshof
Earl Hutto
Ed Jenkins
William L. Jenkins
Chris John
Ed Jones
Ron Kind
Jim Kolbe
Martin Lancaster
Tom Latham
Tiffany Lawrence
Jim Lightfoot
Koln McKay
John T. Myers
Sue Myrick
William Flynt Nichols
Chip Pickering
Graham Purcell
Adam Putnam
Ralph Regula
J. Roy Rowland
Martin Sabo
Daniel Schaefer
Jim Slattery
D. French Slaughter
Bob Smith
Neal Edward Smith
Virginia D. Smith
John Sparkman
Floyd Spence
David Stockman
Bob Stump
Mike Synar
Charles H. Taylor
Gene Taylor
Lindsay Thomas
Bennie Thompson
Jill Long Thompson
Edolphus Towns
Bob Traxler
Morris Udall
Wes Watkins
Vin Weber
Jerry Weller
Jamie Whitten
Heather Wilson

Former Puerto Rico Senator Miguel Deynes Soto.

Cabinet officials
 John Rusling Block and Ann Veneman, former secretaries of Agriculture

First Ladies
Rosalynn Carter
Jacqueline Kennedy Onassis
Pat Nixon
Idaho First Lady Patricia Kempthorne

Academics

former Kansas State University President Duane Acker
former Chancellor of Texas A&M University Perry Adkisson
former U.S. Secretary of Education Lamar Alexander
Nobel Prize winners George Beadle and Daniel McFadden
former Arizona State University President Lattie Coor
Colorado State University System President Tony Frank
Harvard University President Drew Gilpin Faust
West Virginia University President Gordon Gee
Steve Gunderson of the Career Education Colleges and Universities
former University of Illinois President Stanley O. Ikenberry
former Yale University President Howard Lamar
former Virginia Tech President William Edward Lavery
former University of New Hampshire President Joan Leitzel
former Clemson University President Max Lennon
former Auburn University President James E. Martin
former Kent State University President Glenn Olds
former University of Nebraska President Ronald Roskens
former Penn State University President Graham B. Spanier
former University of Maryland President John S. Toll
former Mississippi State University President Donald W. Zacharias

Arts and literature
Frank Herbert, American Science Fiction writer 
Jim Davis, cartoonist
Pulitzer Prize winning novelist John Updike

Business and industry

Andrew Bosworth of Facebook
Colby Chandler of Eastman Kodak
Arnold W. Donald of Carnival Corporation
Bob Evans
Ken C. Hicks of Footlocker
Bill Mensch of the Western Design Center
Javier Palomarez of the United States Hispanic Chamber of Commerce
Harold Poling of the Ford Motor Company
Orville Redenbacher
Edward B. Rust, Jr. of State Farm Insurance
Jesse W. Tapp of Bank of America
Randall L. Tobias of Eli Lilly and Co.
Leland Tollett of Tyson Foods
Frank L. VanderSloot of Melaleuca
Nancy Zieman of Sewing with Nancy

Entertainment and media

Anne Burrell of the Food Network
Johnny Carson
Steve Doocy
Nancy Grace
Florence Henderson
Holly Hunter
Karen Kilgariff
David Letterman
Miss America Jacque Mercer
Jim Nabors
Aubrey Plaza
Donna Reed
Julia Roberts
Sissy Spacek
Tony Award nominee Tom Wopat

Military

 General Creighton Abrams
 Lieutenant General Russel L. Honoré
 General Hugh Shelton
 Brigadier General Wilma Vaught

Music
Roy Acuff
Luke Bryan
Glen Campbell
Johnny Cash
John Denver
Vince Gill
Faith Hill
Jermaine Jackson
Reba McEntire
Sherrill Milnes
Jennifer Nettles
Randy Owen
Dolly Parton
Charley Pride
Kevin Richardson
Jean Ritchie
Roy Rogers
Ricky Skaggs
Trisha Yearwood

Sciences and technology
4-H alumni include the astronauts:
 Bonnie J. Dunbar
 Ellison Onizuka
 Jerry L. Ross
 Alan Shepard
 Peggy Whitson
 Donald E. Williams

Sports

Robert A. "Bob" Baffert, racehorse trainer
Johnny Bench
U.S. Triple Crown jockey Steve Cauthen
Olympic Gold Medal winner Stacy Dragila
NASCAR Champion Ned Jarrett
Archie Manning
National Collegiate Basketball coach Pat Summitt
Dan Reeves
Original owner of the Miami Dolphins Joe Robbie
All-Time leading women's professional basketball scorer Katie Smith
Heisman Trophy winner Herschel Walker
Reggie White

References

4-H